Høgfjell  is a mountain in the municipality of Ringerike in Buskerud, Norway.

External links
Map of Høgfjell 
Høgfjell (geoview.info)

Mountains of Viken